Friedrich Haag (14 September 1930 – 15 June 2022) was a German politician. A member of the Free Democratic Party, he served in the Landtag of Baden-Württemberg from 1967 to 1992.

Haag died in Stuttgart on 15 June 2022 at the age of 91.

References

1930 births
2022 deaths
Free Democratic Party (Germany) politicians
Members of the Landtag of Baden-Württemberg
20th-century German politicians
Politicians from Stuttgart
Commanders Crosses of the Order of Merit of the Federal Republic of Germany
Recipients of the Order of Merit of Baden-Württemberg